Mulloka was an Australian-designed sonar system installed on ships of the Royal Australian Navy.  It was optimised for the warm and shallow waters common off Australia and used a high frequency. The system was developed during the 1970s, with   being used as the trial ship for Mulloka between 1974 and 1979. These trials ended on 17 August 1979 when the system was accepted for service. Mulloka was subsequently fitted to all the RAN's River-class destroyer escorts and two of the six s. It was removed from the frigates during the 2000s as part of an upgrade of their capabilities.

References

Military equipment of the Royal Australian Navy
Cold War military equipment of Australia
Sonar